Wings of a Dove may refer to:
"Wings of a Dove" (Bob Ferguson song), also recorded by Ferlin Husky
"Wings of a Dove" (Van Dyke Parks song), recorded by Brian Wilson on his album Orange Crate Art
"Wings of a Dove" (Madness song)
"On the Wings of a Dove (Ghost Whisperer)", an episode of the TV series Ghost Whisperer
Hear My Prayer, a Christian anthem well known for the line "O for the wings, for the wings of a dove!"